The Tabasara River is a river of Panama. The Barro Blanco dam, a gravity dam, was built on the Tabasara river. It began generating in 2017.

See also
List of rivers of Panama
List of rivers of the Americas by coastline

References

 Rand McNally, The New International Atlas, 1993.
CIA map, 1995

 Rivers of Panama